Chris Barrie (born Christopher Jonathan Brown, 28 March 1960) is a British actor, comedian, and impressionist. He worked as a vocal impressionist on the ITV sketch show Spitting Image (1984–1996) and as Lara Croft's butler Hillary in Lara Croft: Tomb Raider (2001) and Lara Croft Tomb Raider: The Cradle of Life (2003). Barrie is most renowned for starring as Arnold Rimmer in 13 seasons of the sci-fi space comedy Red Dwarf between 1988 and 2020, and as Gordon Brittas in 7 seasons of the BBC leisure centre sitcom The Brittas Empire (1991–1997),

Early life and career
Barrie was born in Hanover, Lower Saxony, West Germany, to a father who was serving in the British Army, and attended Methodist College Belfast boarding school in Northern Ireland. After dropping out of his Combined Studies course at Brighton Polytechnic, he became a grave filler. He began his television career as a sports personality impersonator on The David Essex Showcase in 1982.

He adopted the surname "Barrie" as there was already an actor named Chris Brown on the Equity UK lists. He was a regular on Saturday Live, amongst performers like Fry and Laurie, Rik Mayall and Ben Elton. Barrie provided the voice of Ronald Reagan in the pop song "Two Tribes" by Frankie Goes to Hollywood, as well as various vocalizations for other tracks by FGTH and Art of Noise. He also appeared as an impressionist on the BBC's Carrott's Lib between 1983 and 1984, and he starred in his own sketch show Pushing Up Daisies (re-titled Coming Next for the following season) from 1984 to 1985 alongside Hale and Pace and Carla Mendonça. In 1987, he appeared as a French Revolutionary in Blackadder the Third (episode "Nob and Nobility") and did various parts in The Young Ones both as an actor and a voice-over.

Red Dwarf
Barrie has played the character Arnold J. Rimmer in all twelve series of Red Dwarf, appearing in almost every episode of the series, absent only for a period during series 7. When an unsold pilot for an American version of the show was produced, Barrie was invited to reprise his role as Rimmer. He passed up the offer because of the constraint of the five-series contract.
He starred in the 2020 special Red Dwarf: The Promised Land, alongside the main cast of Craig Charles, Danny John-Jules and Robert Llewellyn (Series 3–present).
In addition to starring in the TV series, Barrie also narrated the first two Red Dwarf books, Infinity Welcomes Careful Drivers (1992) and Better Than Life (1995), including using his vocal talents to recreate the voices of the other characters, as they sound in the show.

The Brittas Empire
Barrie played Gordon Brittas, the title role in The Brittas Empire, a BBC sitcom running from January 1991 to February 1997 for seven series, with 52 episodes, including two Christmas specials. Brittas was the well-meaning but incompetent manager of Whitbury New Town Leisure Centre. Each episode featured a disastrous occurrence, which Brittas was sure he could sort out, oblivious to the fact he was usually its cause.

In 2014, Barrie reprised his role as Gordon Brittas in the music video for Little Mix's version of "Word Up!".

In 2017 the cast reunited for the reopening of Ringwood Leisure centre where a lot of the series was recorded.

Roles in television and films

Barrie's TV work includes Britain's Greatest Machines with Chris Barrie, screened on the National Geographic channel from 4 June 2009. Each of the four episodes features some of the most notable air, sea, and land vehicles and equipment of the 1930s, 1950s, 1960s, and 1980s, respectively. The second series of four episodes was transmitted in February 2010, with the 1910s, 1920s, 1940s, and early steam trains as the subjects of each episode.

Barrie has also hosted the television series Chris Barrie's Massive Engines and Chris Barrie's Massive Machines on the Discovery Channel, later shown on Channel 5 and released on DVD. The latest in this series Massive Speed with Chris Barrie was shown on Discovery Channel from November 2006. In 2006, he appeared as a regular team captain in the BBC Two quiz show Petrolheads and was the star of the British crime/comedy/drama film Back In Business, in which he played Tom Marks.
Between 2015 and 2018 he was the voice-over for Channel 5's Car Crash TV and 2018–2019 Idiot TV.

Filmography
 1983–1984 Appearances on the BBC Radio 4 sketch show Son of Cliché.
 1984 Voice impersonation of Robin Day on the Art of Noise track "Close Up".* 1984 The ship's captain in the wall-poster cut scene during The Young Ones episode "Nasty".
 1985 Voice impersonations on recordings by Frankie Goes to Hollywood:
 as Ronald Reagan on the 12-inch release of "Two Tribes".
 as Mike Read, banning the single "Relax", on the 12-inch release of "The Power of Love".
 as HRH Prince Charles on "Tag", from the album Welcome to the Pleasuredome.
 1986 Voice of Ronald Reagan in the video to the Genesis song "Land of Confusion".
 1987 Trevor, the director of the mock panel show "Ooer, Sounds a Bit Rude" in episode two of Filthy Rich & Catflap.
 1987 A revolutionary in the French embassy in Blackadder The Third (Episode: Nob and Nobility).
 1992 Voice of a motorbike racing commentator in episode 3 of the BBC Comedy series Grace and Favour.
 1993–1995 The voices of Captain Smollett and Ben Gunn in The Legends of Treasure Island.
 1994 The voice of Simon the Sorcerer in the Amiga CD32 re-release of the Adventure Soft computer game Simon the Sorcerer .
 1997–1998 Gary Prince in A Prince Among Men.
 2001 Hillary the Butler in the film Lara Croft: Tomb Raider
 2003 Hillary the Butler in the film Lara Croft Tomb Raider: The Cradle of Life.
 Doubting Thomas in a small series of television advertisements for Anglian Windows.
 The voice of Jif Micro Liquid.

 2015–2018 Narrator for the Channel 5 show Car Crash TV.

Personal life
Barrie's interests include vintage motorbikes and collecting fast cars. In 1995, he released a video called Chris Barrie's Motoring Wheel Nuts, a showcase for his personal car collection. His current classic car collection consists of a Triumph TR2, MGB-GT, Wolseley 1500 and a Jaguar XJ6 (his everyday car).

He has been married twice: first to Monica De Meo from 1987 to 1990 and then to Alecks (1997–present) with whom he has two sons. He lives in Cookham, Berkshire.

References

External links

 
 
 
 Chris Barrie on National Geographic Channel

Interviews
AYME Interview – Association of Young People with ME
 26 September 2005: BBC – Wiltshire – Films – Interview with Chris Barrie Play audio
 11 August 2005: BBC – Wiltshire – Mark Seaman Interview with Chris Barrie Play audio 
 Video Interview with Chris Barrie

1960 births
Alumni of the University of Brighton
British impressionists (entertainers)
British male comedians
British male comedy actors
British male film actors
British male television actors
British television presenters
British male voice actors
Living people
People educated at Methodist College Belfast
Male actors from Belfast
20th-century British comedians
21st-century British comedians